Crook County School District #1 is a public school district based in Sundance, Wyoming, United States.

Geography
Crook County School District #1 serves all of Crook County, including the following communities:

Incorporated places
Town of Hulett
Town of Moorcroft
Town of Pine Haven
Town of Sundance
Unincorporated places
Aladdin
Alva
Beulah

Schools
Grades 8-12
Bear Lodge High School (Alternative)
Grades 7-12
Moorcroft Secondary School
Sundance Secondary School
Grades K-6
Moorcroft Elementary School
Sundance Elementary School
Grades K-12
Hulett School

Student demographics
The following figures are as of October 1, 2019.

Total District Enrollment: 1,201
Student enrollment by gender
Male: 612 (50.96%)
Female: 589 (49.04%)
Student enrollment by ethnicity
American Indian or Alaska Native: 16 (1.33%)
Asian: 2 (0.17%)
Black or African American: 9 (0.75%)
Hispanic or Latino: 25 (2.08%)
Two or More Races: 22 (1.83%)
White: 1,127 (93.84%)

See also
List of school districts in Wyoming

References

External links
Crook County School District #1 – official site.

Education in Crook County, Wyoming
School districts in Wyoming